Edward Chodorov (April 17, 1904 – October 9, 1988), was a Broadway playwright, and the writer or producer of over 50 motion pictures.

Filmography
 Kind Lady (1951, writer)
 Road House (1948, writer/producer)
 The Hucksters (1947, writer)
 Undercurrent (1946, writer)
 The Man from Dakota (1940, producer)
 A Hundred to One (1939, producer)
 Rich Man, Poor Girl (1938, producer)
 Spring Madness (1938, writer/producer)
 Woman Against Woman (1938, writer/producer)
 Yellow Jack (1938, writer)
 The Devil Is Driving (1937, producer)
 The Devil's Playground (1937, associate producer)
 The League of Frightened Men (1937, writer/producer)
 Craig's Wife (1936, associate producer)
 Kind Lady (1935, writer)
 Madame Du Barry (1934, writer)
 The World Changes (1933, writer)
 Captured! (1933, writer/producer)
 The Mayor of Hell (1933, writer)
Uncredited
 The Story of Louis Pasteur (1936, writer)
 Snowed Under (1936, contributor)

Bibliography

Plays
 Oh, Men! Oh, Women! (1953), later adapted into a 1957 film
 Common Ground (1945)
 Decision (1944)
 Those Endearing Young Charms (1943)
 Cue for Passion (1940) with H. S. Kraft
 Kind Lady (1935, writer)
 Wonder Boy (1931) with Arthur Barton

Blacklist
Chodorov was blacklisted in 1953 by Hollywood studios for his failure to cooperate with the House Committee on Un-American Activities. He was identified as a Communist Party member by Jerome Robbins.

References

External links 
Edward Chodorov Papers at the Harry Ransom Center

Edward Chodorov, 84, Playwright And Writer and Producer of Films (obituary); The New York Times, October 12, 1988

American male screenwriters
20th-century American dramatists and playwrights
Film producers from New York (state)
Hollywood blacklist
1904 births
1988 deaths
Writers from New York City
American male dramatists and playwrights
20th-century American businesspeople
20th-century American male writers
Screenwriters from New York (state)
20th-century American screenwriters